The Turbomeca Orédon was a small French turbo-shaft / Auxiliary Power Unit (APU) engine produced by Turbomeca in the late 1940s.

Developed as a turbo-shaft / APU derivative of the TR 011 turbojet, the Orédon drove an alternator and was used as an aircraft auxiliary power unit. “Orédon” was reused for a later helicopter turboshaft design.

The Turbomeca Piméné,  a larger turbojet version of the TR 011 / TT 782 / Orédon, was developed with greater mass-flow and single-stage turbine.

Variants
Orédon TT 782Auxiliary Power Unit similar to the Piméné, but smaller, with the gas generator driving an alternator through a gearbox.

Specifications

References

External links
Minijets website : Piméné 

Oredon
1940s turbojet engines
Mixed-compressor gas turbines